Tapinoma festae is a species of ant in the genus Tapinoma. Described by Emery in 1925, the species is endemic to Greece, Iran and Turkey.

References

Tapinoma
Hymenoptera of Europe
Hymenoptera of Asia
Insects described in 1925